Space Mutiny (also known as Mutiny in Space) is a 1988 South African/American space opera action film about a mutiny aboard the generation ship known as the Southern Sun. The film has since developed a cult following after being featured in a popular episode of the television show Mystery Science Theater 3000.

Plot 
The Southern Sun is a generation ship, or a spacefaring vessel that contains a large number of people, whose mission is to colonize a new world. Its voyage from its original homeworld (implied to be Earth) has lasted thirteen generations, so many of its inhabitants have been born and will die without ever setting foot on solid ground. This does not please the antagonist, Elijah Kalgan (John Phillip Law), who conspires with the pirates infesting the nearby Corona Borealis system and the ship's Chief Engineer MacPhearson (James Ryan). Kalgan hatches a plot to disrupt the Southern Sun's navigation systems and use the Enforcers, the ship's police force, to hijack the ship and direct it towards this system. At this point, the inhabitants of the Southern Sun will have no choice but to accept his "generosity".

Kalgan sabotages a key part of the ship just as an important professor's shuttle is on a landing trajectory. The loss of guidance control causes the shuttle to explode. The shuttle's pilot, Dave Ryder (Reb Brown), is able to escape, but the professor dies in the explosion. This sabotage seals off the flight deck for a number of weeks, which gives Kalgan the opportunity to attempt to wrest control. With the Enforcers in his hand, and with the flight deck out of commission, he holds the entire population of the Southern Sun hostage. Commander Jansen (Cameron Mitchell) and Captain Devers enlist Ryder's assistance, aided begrudgingly by Jansen's daughter Dr. Lea Jansen (Cisse Cameron), to regain control of the ship.

Cast
 Reb Brown as Dave Ryder
 John Phillip Law as Flight Commander Elijah Kalgan
 Cameron Mitchell as Commander Alex Jansen
 Cisse Cameron as Dr. Lea Jansen
 James Ryan as Chief Engineer MacPhearson
 Graham Clark as Captain Scott Devers
 Billy Second as Lieutenant Lemont
 Gary D. Sweeney as Ranger

Production 
Space Mutiny stars Reb Brown, Cisse Cameron, Cameron Mitchell and John Phillip Law. The spaceship effects were lifted wholly from the original Battlestar Galactica TV series.

The director of Space Mutiny has stated on his website that he was called away from set due to a death in the family before filming began, and delegated directing duties to the assistant director. Contractually he was apparently unable to get an Alan Smithee credit.  Some commentators began to compile rather large lists of continuity errors.
The engineering areas of the ship were filmed in an industrial building with un-futuristic brick walls, windows and concrete floors, while the bridge looks remarkably like a vintage-1980s corporate office (non-shag, neutral carpeting; white particleboard desks; computers with 16-color ANSI displays, including one with a 5¼ inch floppy disk drive as an ID card reader). Kalgan's "torture chamber" set features contemporary computer keyboards inexplicably mounted on the walls. The characters tend to wear the silver or white lamé outfits that were common to science fiction/futurist productions of the time, while many of the female characters wear spandex leotards.

The film's notable flaws provided substantial material for later spoofing on Mystery Science Theater 3000, and Eccentric Cinema described it as "quite possibly the worst science fiction/space adventure film made in English".

Reception
From contemporary reviews, "Lor." of Variety reviewed the AIP Home Video video cassette release on January 28, 1989. "Lor." declared the film to be "an okay space saga" noting that "Cute model shots provide a patina of space opera section though the special effects are decidedly chintzy."

Mystery Science Theater 3000 
Nine years after its initial release, Space Mutiny was lampooned in a November 1997 episode of movie-mocking television comedy series Mystery Science Theater 3000 (MST3K). The movie's editing flaws, stilted dialog, and poor production lent itself well to the MST3K treatment, and it has repeatedly proved to be one of the most popular episodes, released as part of the MST3K DVD Collection, Vol. 4 from Rhino Entertainment. It was also chosen by fans to appear in the MST3K 2016 and 2019 Turkey Day Marathons. Writer Bill Corbett recalled:

Many of the scenes involving characters being thrown to their deaths over guardrails in the interior were coined as "railing kills" by Mike and the Bots, and inspired Tom Servo to install railings all over the Satellite of Love. Mike and the Bots also mock the fact that a character killed on screen shows up prominently as an extra in later scenes. Throughout the film, the appearances of the characters were sources of ridicule: Dave Ryder, the muscular protagonist, is referred to by many ridiculous names, including, but not limited to, "Slab Bulkhead", "Bolt Vanderhuge", "Hack Blowfist", "Fridge Largemeat", "Big McLarge Huge", "Buff Drinklots", "Stomp Beefknob", "Punt Speedchunk", and "Blast Hardcheese".  Ryder is also compared to Swedish actor Dolph Lundgren.  Ryder's love interest, Lea Jansen, who in the movie appears to be much older than him despite being six years younger, is referred to as Lea's father (Commander Jansen)'s "grandmadaughter"; Commander Jansen is compared to Santa Claus and to God, due to his white hair and beard, while Captain Devers is compared to Sting and Kalgan is noted for his resemblance to Pat Riley. Kalgan receives additional mockery for the similarity of his name to the Calgon bath and beauty products. After Lieutenant Lemont is killed and she later re-appears as an extra, Tom Servo quips "How nice of him to give a dead woman a second chance."

Some ten minutes of footage were cut from Space Mutiny for its use on MST3K. Much of the edited footage featured space battle scenes taken from the original television series of Battlestar Galactica. The version of the film featured in the episode was, in essence, consistent with the full version; the discontinuities apparent in the episode were all present in the 1988 film.  Mike Nelson and the robots did not comment on the reused Battlestar Galactica footage. Series writer Paul Chaplin acknowledged this omission, but did not provide an explanation.

On 14 June 2018, the film was treated to an all-new riffing by Nelson, Corbett and Murphy in one of their "Rifftrax Live!" shows, broadcast to theatres via satellite, this time for the entire film. A rebroadcast was presented on 19 June.

Saga Of A Fugitive Fleet audio drama 

In 2020, the plot of Space Mutiny was adapted for an audio drama Saga Of A Fugitive Fleet, that served as an unofficial continuation of the original Battlestar Galactica series in which original Galactica cast members Terry Carter, Laurette Spang, Anne Lockhart, Noah Hathaway, Sarah Rush and Jack Stauffer reprised their roles without identifying their characters by name.   The drama also utilized archival audio of deceased Galactica cast members Lorne Greene, John Colicos and Richard Hatch.    Series producer Daniel Earnshaw negotiated radio rights to Space Mutiny from the film's producer, David Winters to adapt the story as a launching point for the series which featured three subsequent original Galactica oriented stories.    In the revamped Space Mutiny plot, Kalgan is the head of Fleet Security and stages a mutiny designed to divert the fleet from its search for the planet Earth.    It is also revealed he is the nephew of the Baltar character played by John Colicos in the original series.

References

Sources

External links 
 
 
 
 "Daddy-O's Drive-In Dirt" on Space Mutiny
 MST3K treatment on ShoutFactoryTV

1988 films
Space adventure films
Action International Pictures films
English-language South African films
Films about mutinies
Films scored by Mark Mancina
1980s science fiction action films
Films set on spacecraft
South African science fiction action films
1980s exploitation films
Generation ships in fiction
1980s rediscovered films
1980s English-language films
American space opera films
American space adventure films
American science fiction action films
Films directed by David Winters
1980s American films